Tang kwok hin is a Hong Kong mixed media artist, working as an independent curator and writer. He was born in 1983 in Hong Kong. He received his Master of Fine Arts and Bachelor of Arts (major in Fine Art) from Chinese University of Hong Kong in 2008 and 2006 respectively. His works based on the exploration of the relationships between art and society by means of collage, he also tries giving new meanings to some ready-made objects by exploration and reconstructions.

Career 

Tang’s artwork is known as focusing on the theories of occasion, space, time and hidden rules which are existing in daily life. He describes his works as conceptual based symbolic collage himself. After quitting his place as a part-time visual arts teacher at Hong Kong Institute of Contemporary Culture (HKICC) Lee Shau Kee School of Creativity, he now works as a full-time artist as well as a regular speaker at some educational talks and seminars in order to promote art. 
His works have been collected by a variety of art organizations such as the Hong Kong Museum of Art, Amelia Johnson Contemporary, Deutsche Bank and other private art collectors around the world. He also got many exhibition chances, the most significant one in Art Basel Hong Kong in 2013, displaying his work The weak are meat, while recently, in 2015, he also got solo exhibitions in Hong Kong and Taipei. Moreover, Tang also cooperates with some foreign and local artists in group exhibitions.

Personal life 

Tang Kwok Hin was born and raised in a walled village in Kam Tin, which makes him being more into the relationship between urban development and nature. Most of the time, Tang's works focuses on the theme of city's development, which he tries finding something sceptical on.
Tang has a good relationship with his family. As an artist who has just started his path, his parents are more than willing to help him for the artwork, by simply collecting or purchasing materials.

Awards

2011 

He got the honor to receive Hong Kong Arts Development Awards 2010, Young Artist Award of Visual Arts presented by Hong Kong Arts Development Council, the Special Prize “Personal Exhibition” and Selected Entry in the 5th International Arte Laguna Prize by Italian Cultural Association MOCA and Arte Laguna Office, as well as a place for Artists in the Neighbourhood Scheme V by Leisure and Cultural Services Department and Hong Kong Art Promotion Office.

2010 

His work, Entanglement was selected to the entry of Finalist, Sovereign Asian Art Prize 2010 and he received 40 Under 40 Awards presented by Sovereign Art Foundation and Perspective Magazine respectively.

2009 

He won First prize at Hong Kong Contemporary Art Biennial Award 2009 with his work, The Photo Book of Mu Mu Dao.

References

External links 
 Tang Kwok Hin official website: 1983,Kam Tin Main Road 
 Biography of Tang on Artist Pension Trust
 Kwok Kam Hin - Time Out Hong Kong (1)
 Kwok Kam Hin - Time Out Hong Kong (2)
Tang Kwok Hin portfolio, DVD, Asian Art Archive
Tang Kwok Hin and His Mother Interviewed by C&G, video, Asian Art Archive

Living people
1983 births
Hong Kong artists
Hong Kong writers